Hornungia petraea (also Hutchinsia petraea) is a flowering plant in the family Brassicaceae. 

It is native to North and South America, Eurasia, Africa, Macaronesia.

References

External links

Brassicaceae
Flora of Europe
Flora of Africa
Taxa named by Carl Linnaeus